Ontario West was a federal electoral district represented in the House of Commons of Canada from 1882 to 1904. It was located in the province of Ontario. It was created from parts of Ontario North, Ontario South and York North ridings.

The West Riding of the county of Ontario consisted of the townships of Whitchurch, Uxbridge and Pickering, the town of Newmarket, the village of Uxbridge and the village of Stouffville.

The electoral district was abolished in 1903 when it was redistributed between the three ridings from which it had been created.

Electoral history

|- 
  
|Liberal
|WHELER, George  
|align="right"| 1,793   
 
|Unknown
|MAJOR, Ed. 
|align="right"| 1,035   
|}

|- 
  
|Liberal
|EDGAR, James David 
|align="right"| acclaimed   
|}

|- 
  
|Liberal
|EDGAR, Jas. D.  
|align="right"| 1,900   
  
|Conservative
|MILLER, John  
|align="right"|1,301    
|}

|- 
  
|Liberal
|EDGAR, Jas. D.  
|align="right"|1,867   
  
|Conservative
|WHITE, F.P.  
|align="right"|868    
|}

|- 
  
|Liberal
|EDGAR, Hon. J.D.  
|align="right"| 1,832   
  
|Conservative
|MCCORMACK, W.A.  
|align="right"|1,093    
|}

|- 
  
|Liberal
|GOULD, I.J.  
|align="right"| acclaimed   
|}

|- 
  
|Liberal
|GOULD, Isaac James  
|align="right"| 1,740   
  
|Conservative
|ROCHE, Francis J.  
|align="right"| 1,231    
|}

See also 

 List of Canadian federal electoral districts
 Past Canadian electoral districts

External links 

 Website of the Parliament of Canada

Former federal electoral districts of Ontario
1882 establishments in Ontario
1903 disestablishments in Ontario